Altwies is a small town in the commune of Mondorf-les-Bains, in south-eastern Luxembourg.  , the town has a population of 557.

Mondorf-les-Bains
Towns in Luxembourg